Acanthinus dromedarius is a species of antlike flower beetle in the family Anthicidae. It is found in Central America, North America, and South America.

References

Further reading

 
 
 
 

Anthicidae
Articles created by Qbugbot
Beetles described in 1849